is a Japanese manga series written and illustrated by Yasuhiro Kanō. It tells the story about a school that teaches students how to do magic and the crazy antics of a normal boy who was admitted under special circumstances. It was serialized in Shueisha's shōnen manga magazine Weekly Shōnen Jump from May 2006 to May 2008, within a total of ninety-nine chapters compiled into ten tankōbon volumes.

Plot
M×0 centers around Taiga Kuzumi, a hot-tempered young man who is able to hold his own in a fight. During an interview to determine if he can attend  that he had plans of joining, Taiga is asked what he would do if he could use magic. "Conquer the World" is his reply and it is quickly followed by an outburst of laughter from a girl. Upon confronting the girl, she realizes how rude it was of her to laugh at his answer and tries to apologize, ultimately grasping his hands with tears in her eyes. After that point, he does not remember much else about the interview, but one thing he cannot change: he failed to enter the school. Blaming the girl for his failing to enter the school, he goes to Seinagi to confront her about it, when a teacher mistakes Taiga for a student ditching class and pulls him through some type of strange energy barrier that surrounds the school. Without realizing what has just happened, he has set foot on a school dedicated to teaching its students how to use magic, though the shock of his first encounter with it freaks him out so much that he tries to get away from the teacher as fast as he can, effectively convincing the latter that he is a suspicious person.

After a confrontation where he is hit with a rather odd spell, he is able to tie the teacher up and run away. Unfortunately, he gets into some more trouble with some upperclassman and during this time is surprised to have found the girl from the interview attending the school. His main priority is then changed from merely survival in a strange land to finding this girl and conveying his feelings of romantic attraction to her, which have most suddenly become clear to him. Later on, due to various circumstances surrounding strict rules of the school, Taiga is admitted into the school but with only one difference from all the other students: he can't use magic. He must now try to survive in a school of magic and try to fool the entire school that he's a powerful magic user at the same time.

Characters

Taiga is a normal guy who fails at first to get into the high school of his choice, but is soon after taken into the school grounds against his will when he is mistaken for a truant student. He tends to have a very strong-willed personality and never wants to back down from anything. His personality is only matched by his physical strength, as he extremely skilled in hand-to-hand combat which is a result of his sister practicing on him constantly. At his preliminary interview into the school of magic he attends, he met a girl named Aika Hiiragi, who he instantly has feelings towards. Once admitted to the school, he quickly finds out that he will not be learning any magic for the time being until they can issue him a proper magic plate, a sort of magical data storage device, which allows for magical spells and power to be stored. As it is, ever since he was admitted to the school, he has wished he could use magic someday. While he is unable to use magic, much of the school believes his magic skills are far superior to any normal freshman, which makes him very popular.
During an incident with school bullies who stole plates from students, Taiga lost his temporary plate. He faced either expulsion, or to make a wish, as all students who graduated from the magic school are allowed a wish in proportion to the amount of magical power they have acquired. Depending on the wish the principal was to judge if Taiga would be allowed to remain in the school as losing a plate was a serious offense. Taiga's wish was so that he could "Grant someone else's wish if that person isn't able to grant that wish on their own." The person in question was Aika, who in a chat revealed that her mother died while she was still young, and her greatest wish would be to see her. The principal had a lie-discovering spell cast on herself so she would be able to see if Taiga answered truthfully, which he did. The principal was content and granted him his own personal plate, The M0.

Aika is a young girl attending Seinagi Private High School and is thus a mage in training. She has a unique trait in that she is able to laugh at nearly anything relatively comical, which always ends up being loud and unrestrained. Her father is one of the magic teachers at her school. Aika has a naturally kind and forgiving personality and it takes a lot for her to not forgive someone for anything they have done to wrong her. She also has a natural clumsiness, which often makes it difficult for her to recite magic spells. Her main magic revolves around invisibility, changing objects' shape and 'voice warp', something like a sound beam, which is depicted as dangerous and scary by almost everyone (even her father) though its uses in a day are very limited.
During her elementary and junior high school years, she attended all-girl schools, so this is her first time experiencing co-ed schooling. She does not recall her mother because she lost her at a young age; her wish when she graduates is to see her mother, even though the magic to do this must be extremely powerful. At first Taiga got on her bad side, though she grew to see him as a friend and seems to have developed feelings for him.

Kenjirou is a 37 year old widower who is Aika's father and the chairman of the magical arts at Seinagi High School. The students of the school show him a lot of respect, always bowing when he passes by and making sure not to upset him. This is because his magic skills are second only to the principal herself and thus every student fears him. The only way he was able to keep his job after Taiga found out about the school was to have Taiga join the school as a student. He is very protective of his daughter, especially if it involves anything having to do with Taiga, who is in the same class as her.

Manga

Written and illustrated by Yasuhiro Kanō, M×0 was serialized in Shueisha's shōnen manga magazine Weekly Shōnen Jump between May 8, 2006 and May 19, 2008. Its 99 individual chapters were compiled into ten tankōbon volumes published between November 2, 2006 and August 4, 2008.

The manga has been published in France by Tonkam, in Italy by RW Edizioni, and in Argentina by Ivrea.

References

Further reading

External links

2006 manga
Shōnen manga
Shueisha manga